Stark's lark (Spizocorys starki) is a species of lark in the family Alaudidae. It is found in Angola, Botswana, Namibia, and South Africa. Its natural habitats are dry savannah and subtropical or tropical dry shrubland. Captain George Shelley named the species in honour of Arthur Stark.

Taxonomy and systematics
Stark's lark was originally classified in the genus Calandrella and was then moved from the genus Eremalauda to Spizocorys in 2009. This species is alternately named as Stark's short-toed lark.

References

External links
Species text - The Atlas of Southern African Birds

Stark's lark
Birds of Southern Africa
Stark's lark
Stark's lark
Taxonomy articles created by Polbot